Irish War may refer to:

 Irish War of Independence (1919–1921)
 Irish Civil War (1922–1923)
 The Troubles (late 1960s–1998)